Targovishte Airport (IATA code: TGV, ICAO code: LBTG), also known Buhovtsi Airfield, is located near the village of Buhovtsi, 13 km from the city of Targovishte. Its unique location gives a chance for service of an area covering three regions including Targovishte, Shumen and Razgrad Provinces. It is currently inoperational because of the lack of financial resources.

See also
Targovishte Province at Wikipedia
List of airports in Bulgaria

References

Targovishte Province Web Site

External links
The Airport Guide
Civil Aviation Administration

Buildings and structures in Targovishte Province
Airports in Bulgaria